Philip Price is the lead singer and songwriter for the Northampton, Massachusetts-based band Winterpills, and also records and tours solo. He has also been involved in the New England-based bands Gay potatoes, The Maggies, Memorial Garage, and Feet Wet.

References

Living people
American rock singers
American male singers
American rock songwriters
American male songwriters
Signature Sounds artists
1960 births